Xylota suecica is a species of hoverfly in the family Syrphidae.

Distribution
Sweden.

References

Eristalinae
Insects described in 1943
Diptera of Europe
Taxa named by Oscar Ringdahl